Marandegan (also Romanized as Mārandegān; also known as Mārdegān) is a village in Kahnuk Rural District, Irandegan District, Khash County, Sistan and Baluchestan Province, Iran. At the 2006 census, its population was 729, in 176 families.

References 

Populated places in Khash County